Antonio Manicone (born 27 October 1966) is an Italian professional football manager and a former player, who functioned as a midfielder, both as a defensive midfielder, and as a deep-lying playmaker.

Career
Despite playing for several Italian clubs throughout his career, Manicone spent several years with Serie A side Inter (1992–96), the team with which he began his career for a season in 1985, winning the UEFA Cup with the club in 1994.

During his time with the Milan club, he earned his only international cap for Italy under manager Arrigo Sacchi, in a 3–0 away win over Estonia in a 1994 World Cup qualifying match on 22 September 1993.

Following his retirement as a player in 2003, he later pursued a career as a manager. He was an assistant of Vladimir Petković for S.S. Lazio.

Style of play
A quick, efficient, and tactically versatile player, Manicone was capable of operating in several midfield positions, as an advanced playmaker, as a deep-lying playmaker, and also as a defensive midfielder, where he excelled due to his work-rate, physique and ability to break down opposition plays. Due to his technique, vision, and long passing ability, he was capable of creating chances after winning back possession.

Personal life
Manicone's son Carlo Manicone is also a professional footballer who plays for FC Lugano in Switzerland. His nephew, Lorenzo Malagrida, is also a professional footballer.

Honours
Inter
 UEFA Cup: 1993–94

References

External links
 

1966 births
Living people
Italian footballers
Italy international footballers
Association football midfielders
Serie A players
Serie B players
Palermo F.C. players
Calcio Foggia 1920 players
Udinese Calcio players
Inter Milan players
Genoa C.F.C. players
A.C. Perugia Calcio players
Cosenza Calcio 1914 players
Calcio Lecco 1912 players
Aurora Pro Patria 1919 players
Italian football managers
UEFA Cup winning players